Stanford Technology Ventures Program (STVP) Entrepreneurship Corner (ECorner) (Formerly Educators Corner) is a free online archive of entrepreneurship resources for teaching and learning. The purpose of the project is to support and encourage faculty around the world who teach entrepreneurship to future scientists, engineers, managers, and others. The site has been developed by a team of educators, entrepreneurs, engineers and designers at the Stanford Technology Ventures Program (STVP).
The project has been financially supported by Stanford University and a number of sponsors. Other collaborators in its creation include the Stanford Center for Professional Development and Stanford Video.

Website content
The design of the archive is based on feedback from entrepreneurship educators regarding the challenges faced when teaching entrepreneurship. Resources include video clips, podcasts, syllabi, books, conferences, and listings of entrepreneurship programs.

Partners
The STVP Entrepreneurship Corner is partnering with London Business School, the Strascheg Center for Entrepreneurship in Munich, and the Centre for Scientific Enterprise Limited (CSEL) in developing shared resources and content.

About STVP
The Stanford Technology Ventures Program (STVP) is the entrepreneurship education and research center located within the School of Engineering at Stanford University. The center is hosted by the department of Management Science and Engineering. The purpose of the center is to accelerate high-technology entrepreneurship research and education for engineers and scientists worldwide. STVP supports academic research on high-technology entrepreneurship and teaches a wide range of courses to science and engineering students on campus. Outreach programs include annual conferences, campus-wide collaboration, and dissemination of teaching content through the Entrepreneurship Corner website.

Speakers 
Speakers include Guy Kawasaki (The Art of the Start Author), Mark Zuckerberg (Facebook founder) and Larry Page (Google Co-founder). There are also speakers from companies including Mozilla,  Hewlett Packard, Electronic Arts and Tesla Motors.

See also 
 List of educational video websites

References

External links
Stanford Entrepreneurship Corner Videos and Podcasts, Stanford Technology Ventures Program

Entrepreneurship organizations
Stanford University